The Dr. A. Q. Khan Research Laboratories, or KRL for short, is a federally funded, multi-program national research institute and national laboratory site primarily dedicated to uranium enrichment, supercomputing and fluid mechanics. It is managed by the Ministry of Energy for the Government of Pakistan. The laboratory is located in Kahuta, a short distance north-east of Rawalpindi, Punjab, Pakistan.

The site was organized to produce weapons-grade nuclear material, primarily weapons-grade uranium, as part of Pakistan's secretive atomic bomb program in the years after the Indo-Pakistani war of 1971. Chosen to be a top-secret location, it was built in secrecy by the Pakistan Army Corps of Engineers. It was commissioned under the Army engineers with civilian scientists joining the site in late 1976. During the midst of the 1970s, the site was the cornerstone of the first stage of Pakistan's atomic bomb program, and is one of the many sites where classified scientific research on atomic bombs was undertaken.

The KRL has prestige for conducting research and development to be able to produce highly enriched uranium (HEU) utilizing the Zippe-method of gas centrifuge– the other user of this method is the Urenco Group in the Netherlands. Since its inception, many technical staff have been employed, mostly physicists and mathematicians, assisted by engineers (both Army and civilians), chemists, and material scientists. Professional scientists and engineers are delegated to visit this institute, after undergoing strict screening and background checks, to participate as visitors in scientific projects.

As of its current mission, KRL is one of the largest science and technology research sites in Pakistan, and conducts multidisciplinary research and development in fields such as national security, space exploration, and supercomputing.

History

As early as the 1970s, the early stage of Pakistan's atomic bomb program focused its primary efforts on producing and developing a weapons-grade plutonium nuclear device under the research led by the Pakistan Atomic Energy Commission (PAEC) at its national laboratory, the Pakistan Institute of Nuclear Science and Technology (PINSTECH) in Nilore. In 1974, India conducted a surprise nuclear test, (Smiling Buddha), so PAEC launched a clandestine uranium enrichment project with nuclear engineer Sultan Mahmood becoming its director– Dr. Abdul Qadeer Khan joined the program in 1974 as an adviser. Work at the Kahuta site was initiated by Prime Minister of Pakistan, Zulfikar Ali Bhutto.

After disagreeing with Director Sultan Mahmood's calculations and feasibility report submitted to the government, Prime Minister Bhutto detached the work from PAEC by making Dr. Abdul Qadeer Khan its chief scientist in 1976. The uranium program was moved to Kahuta where the project was established as the Engineering Research Laboratories (ERL). According to Dr. Khan, materials were imported from Europe with the help of two procurement officers; one of them was Engineer Ikramul Haq Khan, deputed to KRL via Major-General Ali Nawab, Hilal-i-Imtiaz (Military) 1979.

Wanting a capable civil engineer to supervise the construction, Bhutto asked the Chief of Army Staff for the selection, and the Engineer-in-Chief chose Brigadier Zahid Ali Akbar to lead the program. Because the experiments were deemed too dangerous to conduct in a major city, the operations were moved in a remote mountainous northern areas of Pakistan. The entire site and Kahuta was rebuilt in the 1980s by the Corps of Engineers under Lieutenant-General Zahid Ali Akbar, with logistics provided by the Military Engineering Service. Conducting classified research, the facility was heavy secured by both the Pakistan Army and the Pakistan Air Force (PAF). All employees needed badges to pass a checkpoint, and the laboratories are electronically fenced and guarded.

The ERL was intended to spur innovation and provide competition to the weapon design at PAEC. Some renowned scientists, Dr. G. D. Alam (theoretical physicist) from PAEC had joined the ERL and enriched the uranium at Kahuta while Dr. T. M. Shah (a mathematician) and Anwar Ali (a physicist) and some other scientists also supported him. The site quickly installed thousands of gas centrifuges, using the Zippe method, to run at about 65,000 revolutions per minute (rpm) for an average of 10 years.  The Uranium-235 (U235) containing only ~0.7% enriched material is brought to more than 90.0% through three stages of enrichment, leaving the original material depleted from 0.7% to 0.2%, which then now at both civilian and military-grade. In the 1970s, ERL heavily depended on URENCO's method but lessened the dependence in 1979 after local methods were developed with efforts studied and learned by Dr. G. D. Alam and Dr. T. M Shah. Unverified claims were made by KRL in 1983–84 of conducting weapon design tests. After visiting the site in May 1981, President Zia-ul-Haq renamed ERL as the Khan Research Laboratory (KRL) in honor of its founder and senior scientist Abdul Qadeer Khan. The KRL established a system of computer numerical control to control the ultracentrifuges in 1983. By 1986,  KRL began producing highly enriched uranium (HEU) as well as developing the krytron, while classified work on the uranium weapon design took place with uranium hexafluoride (UF6) being reduced to uranium metal and machined into weapon pits. The KRL began publishing a series of academic articles on numerics and computational methods for centrifuge design, including a 1987 article co-authored by Abdul Qadeer Khan on techniques for balancing sophisticated ultracentrifuge rotors.

In the 1990s, KRL had a number of the most high-performance supercomputer and parallel computing systems installed at the facility. A parallel Computational Fluid Dynamics (CFD) division was established which specialized in conducting high performance computations on shock waves in weapons effect from the outer surface to the inner core by using difficult differential equations of the state of the materials used in the bomb under high pressure.

In an investigative report published by Nuclear Threat Initiative (NTI), Chinese scientists were reportedly present at Kahuta in the early 1980s— an unconfirmed indicator of Chinese assistance in the development of equipment at Kahuta. In 1996, the U.S. intelligence community maintained that China provided magnetic rings for special suspension bearings mounted at the top of rotating centrifuge cylinders. In 2005, it was revealed that President Zia-ul-Haq's military government had KRL run a HEU programme in the Chinese nuclear weapons program. Abdul Qadeer Khan also alleged that "KRL has built a centrifuge facility for China in Hanzhong city".

Extended research

The academic research programs and development opportunities at the KRL are supported by the physics departments of the Government College University in Lahore in Punjab and the University of Karachi in Sindh. The KRL supports its physics program through funding and providing scholarship to physics and engineering students at the Government College University.

The continuing efforts to make the laboratories more science efficient led the Ministry of Science (MoST) to grant a three research and fellowship programmes with the Government College University with the support of Pakistan Science Foundation (PSF). Since 1980 at present, the KRL continues to develop the research work on computational mathematics, supercomputing and advanced mathematics to the extended applications to natural sciences.

In 1999, the KRL established a research institute on computer science at Kahuta, which was later integrated to University of Engineering and Technology in Taxila.

The civilian research on biotechnology, biology and Genetic Engineering is supported by the KRL at the University of Karachi, with the support from Pakistan Science Foundation. The KRL organized a conference on Computational biology in Islamabad to present overview of the scope of computational sciences.

National security program

Apart from researching on uranium and developing the uranium enrichment facilities, the KRL includes a ballistic missile-space research laboratories that competes with the PAEC to produce advanced ballistic missiles ranging for targeting enemy combatant targets and the space exploration. Its space-missile exploration projects based on producing the liquid fuel rockets in comparison to solid fuel rockets projects of the National Development Complex (NDC). The KRL's missile projects are widely believed to be based on North Korean technology; exchanges took place in the late 1990s. The following missiles have been produced by KRL:

 Hatf-I – first tested in 1989.
 Ghauri-I (Hatf V) – first tested in 1999.
 Ghauri-II – has a range of 2,000–2,500 km.

The KRL performs variety of weapons science and engineering projects for Pakistan Armed Forces. Since the 1980s, the KRL is involved in numerous military equipment and conventional weaponry development projects. The resulting systems have been put into service by the Pakistan's military and exported to other friendly nations. The following is a list of known equipment produced under these projects:

 Guided missiles:
 Anza series MANPADS.
 Baktar-Shikan man-portable anti-tank guided missile (ATGM).
 Modules for the BGM-71 TOW ATGM.

 Electrical and electronic equipment:
 Power conditioners for the above missile systems.
 Switched-mode power supplies for the following air defence systems:
 LAADS radar, Skyguard radar, Air Defense Automation System.

 Equipment for clearance of anti-personnel and anti-tank mines, including remote control mine exploders (RCME) and mine-sweeping line charges.

 Laser equipment:
 Laser range-finders, laser warning receivers, laser aiming devices, a laser actuated targeting system for training tank gunners.

 Reactive armour kits for armoured vehicles and APFS-DS anti-tank ammunition for main battle tanks.

 Digital goniometers.

 Electronic Voting Machine (EVM)– the KRL entered in competition with National Institute of Electronics (NIE) and Indra Sistemas of Spain to produce and demonstrate the usage of electronic voting machines. Eventually, the Election Commission of Pakistan awarded the contract to KRL for the final design and production of the electronic voting machines in 2018.

KRL is said to have entered into an agreement with Malaysian businessman Shah Hakim Zain to export weapons to Malaysia.

Notes

References

External links
 Kahuta Research Laboratories
 Global Security Report
 Pakistan developed more powerful centrifuges, Nucleonics Week, 29 January 2007

K
K
K
K
K
K
K
K
K
K
K
K
K
K
K
K
K
Guided missile manufacturers